Faverges-Seythenex is a commune in the Haute-Savoie department in the Auvergne-Rhône-Alpes region in south-eastern France.
It was created on 1 January 2016 when the communes Faverges and Seythenex were merged.

Population

See also
Communes of the Haute-Savoie department

References

Communes of Haute-Savoie
Populated places established in 2016